The 50-episode  anime aired on NHK from January 10 to December 26, 2009. The series was based on The Beast Player novel series by Nahoko Uehashi and was directed by Takayuki Hamana. From episode 31, the opening theme is again "Shizuku" but sung by Hajime Chitose, and the second ending, "Kitto Tsutaete" by Takako Matsu is used from episode 30 onwards. The series was streamed on Crunchyroll with English subtitles on September 4, 2009.

Episode list

DVD volumes
Japanese distributor Aniplex is scheduled to release twelve compilation DVDs between 2009 and 2010. In addition, a box set of the first 30 episodes will be released on March 14, 2010.

References

External links
Kemono no Souja Erin on the NHK website 

Lists of anime episodes
Lists of fantasy television series episodes